X-gene may refer to:

 The mutant factor in Marvel Comics
 X-Gene Platform, an ARM-based computer microarchitecture by Applied Micro Circuits Corporation

See also
 Generation X or Gen X
 XGen Studios, a Canadian video game development studio